Ed Arno (July 17, 1916 – May 27, 2008) was an Austrian-American cartoonist, caricaturist, illustrator and comics artist, contributing to The New Yorker from 1969 to 2001. He was born in Innsbruck, Austria, before moving to the United States. His work appeared in Aventurile lui Drix, Licurici, Luminita, The New York Times, Saturday Review, Cosmopolitan, and Harvard Business Review. His books The Magic Fish and The Gingerbread Man were set to music by Arthur Rubinstein. In 1998, he published a collection of his work, Ed Arno’s Most Wanted.

References

External links
 Lambiek Comiclopedia page.

The New Yorker people
1916 births
2008 deaths
American caricaturists
American cartoonists
American comics artists
Austrian caricaturists
Austrian cartoonists
Austrian illustrators
Austrian comics artists
Austrian emigrants to the United States